Dom Aleixo may refer to:
 Dom Aleixo Administrative Post
 Dom Aleixo Timorese (1886–1943), a World War II hero